is a railway station in the town of Sekigahara, Fuwa District, Gifu Prefecture, Japan, operated by Central Japan Railway Company (JR Tōkai).

Lines

Station layout
Sekigagara Station has two ground-level island platforms connected by a footbridge. The station has a Midori no Madoguchi staffed ticket office.

Platforms

Adjacent stations

|-
!colspan=5|Central Japan Railway Company

History
Sekigahara Station opened on May 1, 1883. The station was absorbed into the JR Tōkai network upon the privatization of the Japanese National Railways (JNR) on April 1, 1987.

Station numbering was introduced to the section of the Tōkaidō Line operated by JR Central in March 2018; Sekigahara Station was assigned station number CA79.

Passenger statistics
In fiscal 2016, the station was used by an average of 1005 passengers daily (boarding passengers only).

Surrounding area
Sekigahara Town Hall
site of the Battle of Sekigahara

See also
 List of Railway Stations in Japan

References

External links

Railway stations in Gifu Prefecture
Tōkaidō Main Line
Railway stations in Japan opened in 1883
Stations of Central Japan Railway Company
Sekigahara, Gifu